Cataprosopus melli is a species of snout moth in the genus Cataprosopus. It was described by Aristide Caradja and Edward Meyrick in 1933 and is known from China.

References

Moths described in 1933
Megarthridiini
Taxa named by Aristide Caradja